The 1998 Intercontinental Final was the twentieth running of the Intercontinental Final and was the second last qualifying stage for Motorcycle speedway riders to qualify for the 1999 Speedway Grand Prix series. The Final was run on 21 August at the Speedway Center in Vojens, Denmark

Intercontinental Final
 20 August
  Vojens, Speedway Center
 Top 2 to 1999 Speedway Grand Prix
 Riders 3-8 plus 1 reserve to GP Challenge

References

1998
World Individual